Najmabad (also Romanized as Najmābād) is a village in Amlash-e Shomali Rural District, in the Central District of Amlash County, Gilan Province, Iran. At the 2006 census, its population was 51, in 16 families.

References 

Populated places in Amlash County